Lozotaeniodes is a genus of moths in the tribe Archipini.

Species
Lozotaeniodes brusseauxi (Gibeaux, 1999)
Lozotaeniodes cupressana (Duponchel, in Godart, 1836)
Lozotaeniodes formosana (Frolich, in Geyer & Hübner, 1830)

See also
List of Tortricidae genera

References

 , 1954, Tijdschr. Ent. 97: 201.
 , 2005, World Catalogue of Insects 5.

External links
tortricidae.com

Archipini
Tortricidae genera